Aluminium arsenide is a semiconductor material with almost the same lattice constant as gallium arsenide and aluminium gallium arsenide and wider band gap than gallium arsenide. (AlAs) can form a superlattice with gallium arsenide (GaAs) which results in its semiconductor properties. Because GaAs and AlAs have almost the same lattice constant, the layers have very little induced strain, which allows them to be grown almost arbitrarily thick. This allows for extremely high performance high electron mobility, HEMT transistors, and other quantum well devices.

Properties
It has the following properties:
Thermal expansion coefficient 5 µm/(°C*m)
Debye temperature 417 K
Microhardness 5.0 GPa (50 g load)
Number of atoms in 1 cm3: (4.42-0.17x)·1022
Bulk modulus (7.55+0.26x)·1011 dyn cm−2
Hardness on the Mohs scale: ~ 5
Insolubility in H2O

Uses
Aluminium arsenide is a III-V compound semiconductor material and is an advantageous material for the manufacture of optoelectronic devices, such as light emitting diodes.

Aluminium arsenide can be prepared using well-known methods, such as liquid and vapor-phase epitaxy techniques or melt-growth techniques. However, aluminium arsenide crystals prepared by these methods are generally unstable and generate arsine (AsH3) when exposed to moist air.

Synthesis
Little work has been reported on the preparation of aluminium arsenide, mainly because of the practical difficulties involved. Preparation from the melt is difficult because of the high melting point of the compound (about 1,700 °C) and of the extreme reactivity of aluminium at this temperature. A few workers have prepared small crystals from the melt, and polycrystalline ingots have also been produced. The best of this material has an impurity carrier density of the order of 1019/cm3 and is p-type.

Reactivity
Aluminium arsenide is a stable compound; however, acid, acid fumes and moisture should be avoided. Hazardous polymerization will not occur. Decomposition of aluminium arsenide produces hazardous arsine gas and arsenic fumes.

Toxicity
The chemical, physical and toxicological properties of aluminium arsenide have not been thoroughly investigated and recorded.

Aluminium compounds have many commercial uses and are commonly found in industry. Many of these materials are active chemically and thus exhibit dangerous toxic and reactive properties.

Effects of exposure
Aluminium compounds have many commercial uses and are commonly found in industry. Many of these materials are active chemically and thus exhibit dangerous toxic and reactive properties. The chemical, physical and toxicological properties of aluminium arsenide have not been thoroughly investigated and recorded; however, there are some known chronic and acute symptoms based on chemical delivery.

Inhalation of aluminium arsenide may cause acute irritation to the respiratory system. It may also cause chronic arsenic poisoning, ulceration of the nasal septum, liver damage and cancer/diseases of the blood, kidneys and nervous system. Aluminium arsenide is poisonous if ingested and may cause gastrointestinal and skin effects and acute arsenic poisoning. Chronic implications from ingestion include arsenic poisoning, gastrointestinal disturbances, liver damage, and cancer/disease of the blood, kidneys and nervous system. If applied to the skin, aluminium arsenide may cause acute irritation, but there are no chronic health effects recorded.

Special precautions
Precautions to be taken in handling and storage: Store in a cool, dry place in tightly sealed containers. Ensure there is good ventilation. Open and handle container with care. AlAs reacts on contact with acids or moisture to give a host of volatile, highly toxic arsenic compounds such Arsine.

References

External links

Arsenides
Aluminium compounds
III-V semiconductors
III-V compounds
Zincblende crystal structure